Baby, Sorry is a 2015 Chinese reality family film directed by Pan Liping, Du Lin, Liu Ke, Li Rui and Wang Jun. It was released on January 31, 2015.

Cast
Wang Yan
Wang Hongqin
Steve Ma
Ma Shitian
Shao Bing
Shao Zijiao
Shao Ziheng
Bin Bin
Xiao Xiao Bin

Reception
By February 5, the film had earned  at the Chinese box office.

References

Chinese comedy films